"Calling Your Name" is the debut single by British singer Marilyn. The song was an international hit, peaking at No. 4 on the UK Singles Chart in December 1983 and No. 3 in Australia in April 1984.

The song was later included on the singer's 1985 debut album Despite Straight Lines.

Charts

Weekly charts

Year-end charts

References

1983 songs
1983 debut singles
Mercury Records singles
Marilyn (singer) songs
Song recordings produced by Clive Langer
Song recordings produced by Alan Winstanley
Songs written by Paul Caplin